is a Japanese professional footballer who plays as a winger or an attacking midfielder for Shimizu S-Pulse and the Japan national team.

Club career
Inui was an All Japan High School Soccer Tournament champion in 2006 when his high school, Shiga Yasu HS, won the tournament.

In 2007, Inui joined Yokohama F. Marinos of the J. League Division 1 and made his debut as a professional against Yokohama F.C. in a league match on 10 March. However, he failed to find a regular spot at Marinos and was loaned to then J. League Division 2 Cerezo Osaka in June 2008, earning himself a permanent move at the end of the season.

In July 2011, Inui made the jump to Europe, joining Germany's VfL Bochum. He made his debut in the 2. Bundesliga, when he started in a 2–1 home defeat versus FC St. Pauli on 13 August 2011.

In July 2012, Inui signed a three-year contract with newly promoted Bundesliga club Eintracht Frankfurt after impressive performance in the 2. Bundesliga.

Eibar
On 26 August 2015, Inui was transferred to La Liga side SD Eibar for a then club record fees of € 300,000, after agreeing to a three-year contract. He became the first Asian player to play for the club. On moving to Eibar, Inui said, “It was always my dream to play in the Spanish league one day. It’s been my dream since I was a child and now it’s come true”.

Takashi made his debut for Eibar on 23 September 2015, starting and providing one assist in a 2–2 draw against Levante. He scored his first league goal for Eibar on 10 January 2016 in a 2–1 win against RCD Espanyol, scoring the first goal in the 15th minute of game and also providing assist for second goal.

In April 2017, as the club was chasing a UEFA Europa League place, he was controversially called back to his homeland by Japan's prime minister to serve as a delegate for the visit of King Felipe VI of Spain to Japan. On 21 May 2017, Inui became the first Japanese footballer to score against FC Barcelona, sniping the ball via cross-bar behind Ter Stegen, twice.

Real Betis
On 1 June 2018, upon expiration of his Eibar contract, Inui joined Real Betis on a free transfer for a three-year deal. He made his debut for Betis on 17 August 2018, coming on as a substitute for William Carvalho for the last 25 minutes in 3–0 loss against Levante.

Alavés (loan)
The following 24 January, after being sparingly used, he moved to fellow league Deportivo Alavés on loan until the end of the season. He made his debut for Alavés on 11 January 2019 in a 2–0 win Levante. He scored his first goal for Alavés on 2 March 2019 in a 2–1 victory against Villarreal.

Return to Eibar
On 24 July 2019, Inui returned to Eibar on a three-year deal, for a fee of € 2 million.

Shimizu S-Pulse 
On 22 July 2022, Shimizu S-Pulse announced that they have signed Inui after his contract with Cerezo Osaka was terminated.

International career
Inui made his full international debut for Japan on 20 January 2009 in a 2011 AFC Asian Cup qualification against Yemen. In May 2018 he was named in Japan's preliminary squad for the 2018 World Cup in Russia. On 24 June, Inui scored his first World Cup goal in a 2–2 draw over Senegal during their second group stage match of the tournament. Inui went on to score another goal and registered an assist in the tournament.

Career statistics

Club

International
Scores and results list Japan's goal tally first, score column indicates score after each Inui goal.''

References

External links

1988 births
Living people
Japanese footballers
Association football people from Shiga Prefecture
Association football midfielders
Japan international footballers
J1 League players
J2 League players
Bundesliga players
2. Bundesliga players
La Liga players
Yokohama F. Marinos players
Cerezo Osaka players
VfL Bochum players
Eintracht Frankfurt players
SD Eibar footballers
Real Betis players
Deportivo Alavés players
2013 FIFA Confederations Cup players
2015 AFC Asian Cup players
2018 FIFA World Cup players
2019 AFC Asian Cup players
Japanese expatriate footballers
Japanese expatriate sportspeople in Germany
Expatriate footballers in Germany
Japanese expatriate sportspeople in Spain
Expatriate footballers in Spain